The following lists events that happened during 2021 in Central America.

Incumbents

Belize 

Chief of state: King Charles III (since 2022)
Represented by Governor-General Sir Colville Young (since 1993)
Head of Government: Prime Minister Johnny Briceno (starting 2020)

Costa Rica

Chief of state and Head of Government: President Carlos Alvarado Quesada (since 2018)
First Vice President Epsy Campbell Barr (since 2018)
Second Vice President Marvin Rodríguez Cordero (since 2018)

El Salvador

Chief of state and Head of Government: President Nayib Bukele Ortez (since 2019)
Vice President Felix Augusto Antonio Ulloa Garay (since 2019)

Guatemala
 

Chief of state and Head of government: President Alejandro Eduardo Giammattei Falla (since 2020) 
Vice-President César Guillermo Castillo Reyes (since 2020)

Honduras
 

Chief of state and Head of Government: President Juan Orlando Hernandez Alvarado (since 2014)
Vice Presidents: Ricardo Alvarez, Olga Alvarado, Maria Rivera (since 2018)

Nicaragua
 

Chief of state and Head of government: President Daniel Ortega (since 2007)
Vice President Rosario Murillo Zambrana (since 2017)

Panama
 

Chief of state and Head of Government: President Laurentino "Nito" Cortizo Cohen (since 2019)
Vice President Jose Gabriel Carrizo Jaen (since 2019)

Monthly events

January and February
January 8 – Guatemalan military spokesman Ruben Tellez says that up to 4,000 soldiers will be deployed to reinforce its borders and stop migrants. General Tito Livio Moreno, Honduras' senior military officer, said earlier this week that soldiers would be deployed there to preemptively stop any migrant caravans.
January 9 – Prosecutors in the United States District Court for the Southern District of New York accuse former President Juan Orlando Hernández of taking bribes and protecting drug traffickers.
January 11 – Authorities from Mexico, Guatemala, Honduras, and El Salvador meet in Corinto, Honduras to discuss coordination on migration.
January 13 – Two hundred Honduran migrants march towards San Pedro Sula en route to Guatemala. Guatemalan President Alejandro Giammattei says he may declare a “state of prevention” along the border. Guatemala already requires a negative COVID-19 test and other travel documents.
January 21 – The Mexican National Guard stops a truck with 130 Central American migrants in Veracruz.
January 23 – United States President Joe Biden pledges $4 billion for development in Honduras, El Salvador, and Guatemala.
February 4 – U.S Boarder Patrol officials in Texas release hundreds of Central American families in Laredo and Brownsville after authorities in Tamaulipas, Mexico refuse to take them in because of overcrowding in camps.
February 6 – U.S. Secretary of State Antony Blinken says the agreements with Guatemala, El Salvador, and Honduras to send asylum-seekers back to those countries are suspended.
February 19 – The Group of Seven (G-7) promises an equitable distribution of COVID-19 vaccines, although few details have been provided.
February 23 – The World Food Programme urgently calls for USD $47.3 million to help 2.6 million people in El Salvador, Guatemala, Honduras and Nicaragua hit by famines caused by the economic crises related to COVID-19 and natural disasters.
February 26 – Honduras and Guatemala each receive 5,000 doses of Moderna COVID-19 vaccine, donated by Israel. The vaccines will be destined for health workers. Honduras has had 167,000 infections and 4,000 deaths, while Guatemala has reported 173,000 cases and 6,334 deaths.

March to June
March 2 – A boat with partially decomposed bodies of six migrants, one with a passport from Guinea, is found Cayo Las Palomas, Nicaragua.
March 8 – 5,000 women march in San Salvador and 1,000 in Guatemala City demanding decriminalization of abortion and an end to violence against women on International Women's Day.
June 11 – Eleven countries, private organizations, and international banks pledge USD $110 billion to help Central American countries deal with the root causes of emigration. This is in addition to the USD $300 billion already pledged by the U.S. government.

Programmed and scheduled events

Elections

February 28 – 2021 Salvadoran legislative election
March 3 – 2021 Belizean local elections
Corozal Bay, House of Representatives by-election 
March 14
2021 Honduran general election, 2021 Honduran local elections
2021 Nicaraguan general election

Holidays

January to March

January 1 – New Year's Day
January 19 – Martyrs' Day (Panama)
February 14–15 – Carnival, Public holidays in Panama
February 16 – Ash Wednesday, Panama
March 8 –  National Heroes & Benefactors Day, Belize.

April to June

April 1 – Holy Thursday, Costa Rica
April 2 – Good Friday
April 3 – Holy Saturday
April 5 – Easter Monday
April 11 – Juan Santamaría Day, Costa Rica
April 14 – Pan American Day, Honduras
May 1 – Labour Day, International Workers' Day
May 24 – Commonwealth Day, Belize
June 30 – Army Day, Public holidays in Guatemala

July to September

July 19 – Sandinista Revolution Day, Public holidays in Nicaragua
July 26 – Guanacaste Day, Costa Rica
August 2 – Virgin of Los Angeles Day, Costa Rica
August 6 – Fiesta of San Salvador, celebrated in El Salvador
September 10 – Saint George's Caye Day, Belize
September 14 – San Jacinto Day, Nicaragua
September 15/20 – Act of Independence of Central America, independence from Spain in 1821; celebrated in Costa Rica, El Salvador, Guatemala, Honduras Nicaragua
September 21 – Independence Day, Belize

October to December

October 7 – Francisco Morazán′s Birthday, Honduras
October 8 (probable) – Armed Forces of Honduras Day 
October 11 – Pan America Day, Belize
October 20 – Guatemalan Revolution Day
November 1 – All Saints' Day, celebrated in Guatemala
November 3 – Separation Day (from Colombia, 1903), Panama
November 4 – Flag of Panama Day 
November 5 – Colón Day, Panama
November 10 – Los Santos Uprising Day, Panama
November 19 – Garifuna Settlement Day, Belize
November 29 – Independence Day, Panama
December 8 – Feast of the Immaculate Conception, Nicaragua Panama
December 25 – Christmas Day
December 27 – Boxing Day, Belize

Culture

Sports
March 18-30 – CONCACAF Men's Olympic Qualifying Championship rescheduled for in Guadalajara, Mexico.

Deaths
January 1 – Elmira Minita Gordon, politician, Governor-General of Belize (1981–1993).
January 24 – Roberto Cañas López, 70, Salvadoran politician, guerrilla and academic, signant of Chapultepec Peace Accords.
February 4 – Antonio Azúcar Hernández, 44, Salvadoran diplomat, consul in Tapachula, Chiapas, Mexico; COVID-19.
March 2 – Telma Barria Pinzón, 60, Panamanian diplomat; drowned during landslide in Colombia.
March 3 – Tomas Altamirano Duque, 93, Panamanian politician, Vice President of Panama (1994–1999).

See also

2021 in the Caribbean
COVID-19 pandemic in North America
2020s
2020s in political history
Central American Parliament
2021 Atlantic hurricane season

References

External links

El Universal (Mexico) in English
Al Jazeera (Latin America) in English
Associated Press (Latin America)
Amandala (Belize)

 
2020s in Central America
Years of the 21st century in Central America